Darling is the sixth album by Yui Horie. It was released on January 30, 2008.

Track listing

Time machine
Days (Opening theme song of the anime Nagasarete Airantō)

 (Nagasarete Airantō second ending theme song)
"Say cheese!" (Nagasarete Airantō first ending theme song)

 (Inukami! opening theme song)
LOVE ME DO (cover version of angela song)

Little Honey Bee

References

Yui Horie albums
2008 albums